Mythimna amblycasis is a moth of the family Noctuidae. It was first described by Edward Meyrick in 1899. It is endemic to the Hawaiian islands of Kauai, Oahu, Molokai, Maui, Lanai and Hawaii.

Larvae feed on various grasses, bunch grass and sugarcane. The caterpillars become full grown in about a month from the hatching of the eggs. The full-grown caterpillar is about 38 mm. It is usually cream colored with pale brownish mottlings.

Pupation takes place in an earthen cell a little below the surface of the ground, or beneath stones or rubbish. The pupa is about 19 mm long and 5 mm thick. The moth emerges from the pupa in about two weeks.

Adults have been reported feeding upon the blossoms of Metrosideros species.

External links

Mythimna (moth)
Endemic moths of Hawaii
Moths described in 1899
Moths of Oceania